Karla Paola Muñiz Rojas (born 14 January 2002) is a Dominican futsal player who plays as a winger and a footballer who plays as a right back for the Dominican Republic women's national team.

International career
Muñiz represented the Dominican Republic at the 2016 CONCACAF Girls' U-15 Championship and the 2018 Summer Youth Olympics. She made her senior debut on 18 February 2021 in a friendly home match against Puerto Rico.

References

2002 births
Living people
Dominican Republic women's footballers
Women's association football fullbacks
Dominican Republic women's international footballers
Dominican Republic women's futsal players
Futsal players at the 2018 Summer Youth Olympics